Bagrat I was the King of Abkhazia between 882 and 894. He was the second son of Demetrius II of the Anchabadze dynasty.

Life 
After the usurper John Shavliani seized the throne Bagrat fled to Constantinople and lived there for some time until he returned to Abkhazia in 887. He deposed and put to death Adarnase Shavliani (the son of John Shavliani), reclaimed the throne and married the latter's widow (daughter of Guaram of Samtskhe), with whom he had a son Constantine who succeeded him to the throne of Abkhazia.

Intervention in Tao-Klarjeti 
Bagrat supported his brother-in-law, Nasra who tried to take power in Tao-Klarjeti, the latter killed David I curopalates in 881 and placed on the throne Gurgen I of Tao. After the murder, Nasra was forced to flee to the Byzantine Empire, where he was retrieved by Bagrat I. Bagrat managed to secure the Byzantine military aid for him and invaded the Bagratid possessions on Nasra's behalf in 887. The only son of David I, Adarnase then allied to Ashot I of Armenia and resisted invaders. Thus, a Bagratid dynastic feud evolved into a regional conflict. Eventually, Gurgen I of Tao switched his side and joined Adarnase against Nasra who was defeated and put to death in 888.

Family 
Bagrat I married a daughter of Guaram of Samtskhe:

Issue 
 Constantine III, King of the Abkhazia from 893 until 922 AD.

Genealogy

Notes

References

Sources 
 Marie-Félicité Brosset, Histoire de la Géorgie..
 АБХАЗИЯ - взгляд сквозь века
 A. Bogveradze, Georgian Soviet Encyclopedia, II, p. 127-128, Tbilisi, 1977

Bagrat 01